USS LST-1130 was a  in the United States Navy during World War II.

Construction and commissioning 
LST-1130 was laid down on 5 December 1944 at Chicago Bridge and Iron Company, Seneca, Illinois. Launched on 27 February 1945 and commissioned on 20 March 1945.

During World War II, LST-1130 was assigned to the Asiatic-Pacific theater. She was assigned to occupation and China from  23 September to 2 December 1945, 24 June to 25 July 1946 and 26 July to 24 November 1946.

She was decommissioned on 23 March 1948 and was struck from the Naval Register on 12 March 1948. On 23 March 1948, following a grounding at Yap, Caroline Islands, which left the ship in a condition beyond economical repair.

Awards 
LST-1130 have earned the following awards:

China Service Medal (extended) 
American Campaign Medal
Asiatic-Pacific Campaign Medal
World War II Victory Medal
Navy Occupation Service Medal (with Asia clasp)

Citations

Sources
 
 
 
 

LST-542-class tank landing ships
Ships built in Seneca, Illinois
World War II amphibious warfare vessels of the United States
1945 ships